The Tenjong Dendang Formation is a geologic formation in Malaysia. The band of graptolite- and trilobite-bearing shales interbedded in limestones preserves graptolite, brachiopod and trilobite fossils dating back to the Hirnantian stage of the Late Ordovician period. The sediments were deposited during the Late Ordovician glaciation.

Fossil content 
The following fossils were reported from the formation:

Trilobites 
 Mucronaspis mucronata
 ?Stenopareia sp.

Hyolitha 
 Hyolithida indet.

Strophomenata 
 Plectambonitoidea indet.

Gastropods 
 Lophospira sp.
 ?Megalomphala sp.

Pterobranchia 
 Climacograptus sp.

See also 

 Soom Shale, Hirnantian fossiliferous formation of South Africa
 Tufs et calcaires de Rosan, Hirnantian fossiliferous formation of France
 Cancañiri Formation, Hirnantian fossiliferous formation of Bolivia

References

Bibliography 
 

Geologic formations of Malaysia
Ordovician System of Asia
Paleozoic Malaysia
Hirnantian
Limestone formations
Shale formations
Open marine deposits
Ordovician northern paleotemperate deposits
Paleontology in Malaysia
Formations